The Girls' U16 South American Volleyball Championship is a sport competition for national women's volleyball teams with players under 16 years, currently held biannually and organized by the Confederación Sudamericana de Voleibol (CSV), the South American volleyball federation. The first edition of the tournament was played in Canelones, Uruguay from November 21 to 26.

Results summary

Medals summary

MVP by edition
2011 – 
2013 – 
2014 – 
2015 – 
2017 –

See also

 Boys' U17 South American Volleyball Championship
 Women's U22 South American Volleyball Championship
 Women's Junior South American Volleyball Championship
 Girls' Youth South American Volleyball Championship

References

 CSV

U16
U16
Recurring sporting events established in 2011
International volleyball competitions
International women's volleyball competitions
Youth volleyball
Biennial sporting events
2011 establishments in South America